Vocal Spectrum is a barbershop quartet from St. Charles, Missouri. In 2004, Vocal Spectrum won the Barbershop Harmony Society's International Collegiate Quartet Contest, and on July 8, 2006, they became International Champions, winning the society's International Quartet Contest. A distinctive feature of the quartet is tenor Tim Waurick's ability to sustain notes for upwards of 30 seconds, and the tenor's and lead's incredibly high vocal range, featured in many of the group's recordings and live shows.

The quartet's run for the title is featured in the 2009 feature documentary American Harmony.

Background
Vocal Spectrum began singing together in September 2003. Each member has graduated from Lindenwood University in St. Charles. Each member is also a member of Ambassadors of Harmony, the International Chorus Champion of 2004, 2009, 2012, and 2016. As of the 2006 International Quartet Contest, Vocal Spectrum is the only quartet in history to capture three of the then-four (now five) possible BHS gold medals (Collegiate Quartet, Quartet, Chorus [as members of the Ambassadors of Harmony]).

The only championship that remains for Vocal Spectrum to win is the Barbershop Harmony Society's Senior quartet contest for which they will not become eligible for at least three decades (no member of a competing Senior Quartet can be younger than 55 years old, and the aggregate age of the quartet must equal or exceed 240 years [average age 60 or greater]).

Members
Tim Waurick – tenor
Tenor Section Leader of Ambassadors of Harmony
Produces "TimTracks" barbershop learning tapes for Ambassadors of Harmony and other groups
Member of the Fantasy Gold Quartet along with Jeff Oxley, Tony DeRosa, and Joe Connelly
Eric Dalbey – lead
Lead Section Leader of Ambassadors of Harmony
Common soloist for Ambassadors of Harmony
Jonny Moroni – baritone
Baritone Section Leader of Ambassadors of Harmony
Co-Director of Ambassadors of Harmony
Chris Hallam – bass
Non-performing member of Ambassadors of Harmony

Awards
The group's Vocal Spectrum II recording was awarded "Best Barbershop Album" by the Contemporary A Cappella Society in April 2009. The album's single, Go the Distance, also won as "Best Barbershop Song".

Discography
2006 – Vocal Spectrum
2008 – Vocal Spectrum II
2011 – Vocal Spectrum III
2013 – Vocal Spectrum IV (now Vocal Spectrum Christmas)
2016 – Vocal Spectrum V

See also
Barbershop music
Ambassadors of Harmony
Barbershop Harmony Society
List of quartet champions by year

References

External links
 Official website
 AIC entry

Barbershop Harmony Society
Barbershop quartets
Musical groups established in 2003
Professional a cappella groups